The sharp-tailed snake or sharptail snake (Contia tenuis) is a small species of snake in the family Colubridae. The species is endemic to the Western United States and British Columbia.

Common names
Additional common names for C. tenuis include brown snake, gentle brown snake, Oregon worm snake, Pacific brown snake, Pacific ground snake, and purple-tailed snake.

Geographic range
C. tenuis is distributed through the states of California, Oregon, and Washington, as well as British Columbia, Canada: Southern Vancouver Island, British Columbia around Victoria, British Columbia, and a newly discovered site in Pemberton, British Columbia.

Description
It is distinguished by its sharp tail spine, which is the protruding tip of the last tail vertebra. The spine is not toxic and cannot injure humans. Rather, the tail is used to stabilize small prey, such as slugs, for consumption. The dorsal surface ranges in color from grayish brown to brown to brick red, with bubble-gum pink and peachy-orange specimens occasionally found. The ventral surface is a striking series of black and white crossbars.

Behavior
The sharp-tailed snake is a shy, secretive creature most often encountered under rocks and logs, and rarely to never found in the open. It is able to persist in urban areas where appropriate cover can be found. It is known to burrow into soft soil or cracks in the clay, and may be encountered by people who are digging in the garden or removing concrete. When encountered, the sharp-tailed snake may roll into a ball and remain still. It can be mistaken for a worm by the casual observer.

Diet
The diet of C. tenuis is largely restricted to slugs and eggs of slugs.

Reproduction
The adult female C. tenuis lays 4–16 eggs in the summer, underground or in a burrow.

References

External links
Contia tenuis - Description, Risk Status.
Contia tenuis - Sharp-tailed Snake - Description, Pictures.

Further reading
Baird SF, Girard C (1852). "Descriptions of new species of Reptiles, collected by the U. S. Exploring Expedition under the command of Capt. Charles Wilkes, U. S. N. First part.—Including the species from the Western coast of America". Proc. Acad. Nat. Sci. Philadelphia 6: 174–177. (Calamaria tenuis, new species, p. 176).
Baird SF, Girard CF (1853). Catalogue of North American Reptiles in the Museum of the Smithsonian Institution. Part I.—Serpents. Washington, District of Columbia: Smithsonian Institution. xvi + 172 pp. (Contia mitis, new species, pp. 110–111).
Schmidt KP, Davis DD (1941). Field Book of Snakes of the United States and Canada. New York: G.P. Putnam's Sons. 365 pp., 34 plates, 103 figures. (Contia tenuis, pp. 196–197, Figure 62).
Smith HM, Brodie ED Jr (1982). Reptiles of North America: A Guide to Field Identification. New York: Golden Press. 240 pp.  (paperback),  (hardcover). (Contia tenuis, pp. 162–163).
Zim HS, Smith HM (1956). Reptiles and Amphibians: A Guide to Familiar American Species: A Golden Nature Guide. Revised Edition. New York: Simon and Schuster. 160 pp. (Contia tenuis, pp. 79–80, 156).

Contia
Snakes of North America
Reptiles of Canada
Reptiles of the United States
Reptiles described in 1852
Taxa named by Spencer Fullerton Baird
Taxa named by Charles Frédéric Girard